Ships named Sovereign include:

  was launched at Newcastle in 1789. She traded between London and South Carolina and then as a transport. In 1802 she became a slave ship. She wrecked on 22 January 1804 as she was returning from the West Indies where she had landed her slaves at Trinidad.
  was launched at Shields or Sunderland as a West Indiaman. She made one voyage for the British East India Company (EIC) during which she transported a noted Scottish political prisoner to New South Wales. She then traded with the West Indies and Quebec and was last listed in 1822.
  was launched at Rotherhithe in 1800 as a West Indiaman. The EIC then took her up as an "extra" ship on several contracts; in all she made seven voyages as an East Indiaman for the EIC. After she left the EIC's service in 1817 she continued to trade with India, but under a license from the EIC. She was broken up in 1822.
 , launched in 1991, is a class DP2 type cable ship used for subsea cable installation and repair works.
 , (formerly MS Sovereign of the Seas) is one of three large cruise ships of the  operated by Pullmantur Cruises and formerly by Royal Caribbean International.
 , any one of several English and Royal Navy warships
 , the name of more than one United States Navy ship

See also
 , of the Royal Caribbean line
 , the unsuccessful challenger of the 1964 America's Cup
Sovereign of the Seas (disambiguation)
Royal Sovereign (disambiguation)

Ship names